Colubroidea is a superfamily of snakes in the clade Colubroides that includes Colubridae, with some studies splitting Colubridae into multiple families that make up Colubroidea. Historically, Colubroidea also included other caenophidian snakes such as cobras and vipers, as these snakes form a clade. However these groups are now divided into several distinct, but related, families. Zaher et al. (2009) proposed to redefine Colubroidea for colubrids and related families, while designating Colubroides as the group containing vipers and cobras as well as colubroids. The ReptileDatabase considers Colubroidea to be composed of Colubridae and the members of its sister group, Elapoidea, and does not recognize the division of Colubridae into multiple families.

Classification 
Phylogeny

Families and Subfamilies

Usual taxonomy:
 Family: Colubridae Oppel, 1811
 Subfamily: Grayiinae Günther, 1858
 Subfamily: Calamariinae Bonaparte, 1838
 Subfamily: Ahaetullinae  Figueroa, McKelvy, Grismer, Bell & Lailvaux, 2016
 Subfamily: Colubrinae Oppel, 1811
 Subfamily: Sibynophiinae Dunn, 1928
 Subfamily: Natricidae Bonaparte, 1838
 Subfamily: Pseudoxenodontidae McDowell, 1987
 Subfamily: Xenodontinae Dunn, 1928
 Subfamily: Dipsadinae Bonaparte, 1838
Alternate taxonomy:

Family: Sibynophiidae Dunn, 1928
 Family: Natricidae Bonaparte, 1838
 Family: Pseudoxenodontidae McDowell, 1987
 Family: Dipsadidae Bonaparte, 1838
 Subfamily: Carphophiinae Zaher et al., 2009
 Subfamily: Xenodontinae Dunn, 1928
 Subfamily: Dipsadinae Bonaparte, 1838
 Family: Colubridae Oppel, 1811
 Subfamily: Grayiinae Günther, 1858
 Subfamily: Calamariinae Bonaparte, 1838
 Subfamily: Ahaetullinae  Figueroa, McKelvy, Grismer, Bell & Lailvaux, 2016
 Subfamily: Colubrinae Oppel, 1811

Unknown Genera incertae sedis (not currently placed in a family, usually because of the absence of genetic data, but suspected to be colubroids based on morphology)

Fossil Colubroidea

North America 

 Mexico

South America 

 Legend

 Age - bold is type age (SALMA)
 Formation - bold is Lagerstätte

References

Alethinophidia